Tiarza Tehsil is a subdivision located in South Waziristan District, Khyber Pakhtunkhwa, Pakistan. The population is 45,210 according to the 2017 census.

Notable people
 Jamal Malyar Maseed

See also 
 Kaniguram
 List of tehsils of Khyber Pakhtunkhwa

References 

Tehsils of Khyber Pakhtunkhwa
Populated places in South Waziristan